Luuq District is a district in the southwestern Gedo region of Somalia. Its capital is Luuq. It is mainly inhabited by the Gasargude,marehan and the Faqi Mahamed sub-clan of Dir.

References

External links
 Districts of Somalia
 Administrative map of Luuq District

Districts of Somalia

Gedo